Beauty and the Beast is a traditional fairy tale.

Beauty and the Beast may also refer to:

Film and stage
 Beauty and the Beast (1934 film), a Merrie Melodies animated short film
 Beauty and the Beast (1946 film), a French film directed by Jean Cocteau
 Beauty and the Beast (1962 film), an American film directed by Edward L. Cahn, featuring Meg Wyllie
 Beauty and the Beast (1978 film), a Czechoslovak film directed by Juraj Herz
 Beauty and the Beast (1983 film), a Danish film directed by Nils Malmros
 Beauty and the Beast (1987 film), an American musical film starring Rebecca De Mornay and John Savage
 Beauty and the Beast (franchise), a Disney media franchise
 Beauty and the Beast (1991 film), an animated Disney film
 "Beauty and the Beast" (Disney song), a 1991 song from the film
 Beauty and the Beast (musical), a 1994 Broadway musical based on the film
 Beauty and the Beast Live on Stage, a theme park show at Walt Disney World based on the film
 Beauty and the Beast (video game), several games based on the film
 Beauty and the Beast (2017 film), live-action remake of the Disney feature
 Beauty and the Beast, an animated feature film of 1992 produced by Bevanfield Films
 Beauty and the Beast, an animated feature film of 1992 produced by Golden Films
 Beauty and the Beast (1996 film), an Australian animated television film produced by Burbank Animation Studios
 Beauty and the Beast (1997 film), another animated film produced by Golden Films
 Beauty and the Beast (2005 film), a film starring Jane March and William Gregory Lee
 Beauty and the Beast (2009 film), a film directed by David Lister and starring Estella Warren
 Die Schöne und das Biest (2012 film), a film starring Cornelia Gröschel
 Beauty and the Beast (2014 film), a Franco-German film directed by Christophe Gans

Soundtracks
 Beauty and the Beast (1991 soundtrack), the soundtrack album from the animated film
 Beauty and the Beast (2017 soundtrack), the soundtrack album from the live-action film

Television
 Beauty and the Beast (1976 TV film), an American Hallmark Hall of Fame TV film, starring George C. Scott and Trish Van Devere
 Beauty and the Beast, a 1983 American animated television special produced by Ruby-Spears
 Beauty and the Beast (1987 TV series), an American television drama series aired on CBS between 1987 and 1990
 Beauty & the Beast (2012 TV series), an American television series that debuted on The CW in 2012, loosely based on the 1987 series
 Beauty and the Beast (talk show), an Australian television panel show
 "Beauty and the Beast: Part One", an episode of the 2009 British series Merlin
 "Beauty and the Beast: Part Two"
 "Beauty and the Beast" (Faerie Tale Theatre), a 1984 episode of Faerie Tale Theatre
 "Beauty & the Beast" (X-Men), an episode of X-Men
 "Beauty and the Beasts", an episode of Buffy the Vampire Slayer
 Beauty and the Beast (2009 film) or Beauty and the Beasts: A Dark Tale, a TV movie starring Estella Warren
 Beauty and the Beast Live!, a musical TV special based on the 1991 film

Literature
 Beauty and the Beast (poem), a long poem by Carol Ann Duffy and Adrian Henri
 Beauty and the Beast, an 1886 novel by the English writer Henrietta Keddie, under the pseudonym Sarah Tytler
 Beauty and the Beast, a 1928 novel by the US writer Kathleen Norris
 Beauty and the Beast, a 1982 novel by the US writer Ed McBain

Music
 The Beauty and the Beast (Stormwitch album)
 Beauty and the Beast (Rapsody EP), 2014
 "Beauty and the Beast" (David Bowie song), 1978
 "Beauty and the Beast" (Stevie Nicks song), 1983
 Beauty and the Beast, an album by Fair Game, a band fronted by Ron Keel
 "The Beauty and the Beast", a song by Digital Emotion
 "The Beauty and the Beast", a song by Sven Väth
 "Beauty and the Beast", a song by Band-Maid from New Beginning
 "Beauty and the Beast", a song by Nightwish from Angels Fall First
 "Beauty and the Beast", a song by Wayne Shorter, with Milton Nascimento, from Native Dancer
 Beauty and the Beast, a duo consisting of K-1 wrestler Choi Hong-man and Korean supermodel Kang Soo Hee
 "Les entretiens de la belle et de la bête" ("Conversation of Beauty and the Beast"), a movement from Ma mère l'Oye by Maurice Ravel

Video gaming
 Beauty & the Beast (1982 video game), a video game for the Intellivision
 Beauty and the Beast (1994 video game), an action platformer for the NES
 The Beauty and the Beast Corps, a fictional unit in the video game Metal Gear Solid 4: Guns of the Patriots

Other uses
 Beauty and the Beast (strongman competition)
 Beauty and the Beast (ballet), a ballet version of the fairy tale by David Nixon

See also
 
 Beastly, a 2007 novel by Alex Flinn
 Beastly (film), a 2011 film adaptation of the novel
 La Belle et la Bête (disambiguation)
 Beauty and the Beat (disambiguation)